Bang Yu-jeong (Korean: 방유정; born 6 May 1982), better known by the stage names May (Korean: 메이; Japanese: メイ) and Yuu (Korean: 유우) is a South Korean singer active in Japan.

Career

Wonderland
May is a Korean artist who made her debut in 2006 but wasn't able to gain any success on any releases. May started her music career singing "Miracle" as a theme song along with a F.I.R. cover song "Lydia" as an insert song for a popular Seoul Broadcasting System (SBS) weekend drama "Friends" in late 2005. On 7 March 2006 May had a contract with CJ Music releasing her first EP or mini album entitled "Wonderland" that featured seven songs. May did not gain much success with her first released charted at number 23 on Korean top 200.

Smile
Three months later, on 2 June 2006, May released her second EP or mini album "Smile" with a different publisher, Doremi Media. "Smile" reached number 27 in the chart. She also covered another song from F.I.R which was, "Fly Away". May released two versions of "Smile": a first press limited version with her "M" symbol, and a regular version without the "M" symbol.

A Little Happiness
Early in 2005, Avex launched a project called Show Case Live. It featured samples of eight upcoming artists, including May. She signed under the Avex label later that year. On 21 February 2006, May released her first single "Wonderland", which failed to chart on Oricon. Before Mat's "Smile" EP, she released her second single "Kienai Niji" in May 2006 also failing to chart. On 26 July 2006, May released "Surrender (c/w Lydia)", her third single, which gained her little success. May released her fourth single in autumn on 8 November 2006. By 10 January 2007, Sarai no Kaze was released as her fifth single, also her first single to chart at #132 sold 518 copies in the first week. By end of the month May released her first album "a Little Happiness" chart at #77.

Japanese tour
MAY is about to set off a tour in 2007 after releasing her sixth single "Onna Gokoro" on 4 April 2007.

Discography

Studio albums

Extended plays

Singles

References

1982 births
Avex Group artists
Japanese-language singers of South Korea
Korean-language singers of Japan
K-pop singers
Living people
People from Seoul
South Korean women pop singers
21st-century South Korean singers
21st-century South Korean women singers